Danny Mueller is a retired American-born, Puerto Rico association football midfielder who played professionally in the USL A-League and for the Puerto Rico national football team.

Professional
In 1994, Mueller signed with the expansion Long Island Rough Riders of the USISL.  He played three seasons with Long Island, winning the 1995 USISL Professional League with them.  In 1998, Mueller joined the Staten Island Vipers.  In 1999, Mueller began to reduce his time with the team as he began working as a painter.  He retired at the end of the season.

International
Mueller played for the Puerto Rico national football team in the 1993 Caribbean Cup as well as several qualification games for the cup.

References

Living people
1966 births
Long Island Rough Riders players
Puerto Rican footballers
Puerto Rico international footballers
Staten Island Vipers players
USISL players
A-League (1995–2004) players
USISL Select League players
USL Second Division players
Association football midfielders